Silvio is an Italian male name, the male equivalent of Silvia. Sílvio is a variant of the name in Portuguese. It is derived from the Latin "Silvius", meaning "spirit of the wood," and may refer to:

People
 Silvio Berlusconi (born 1936), Italian politician, entrepreneur, and media magnate
 Silvio Branco (born 1966), Italian boxer
 Silvio O. Conte (1921–1991), US politician and member of the House of Representatives
 Silvio De Sousa (born 1998), Angolan basketball player
 Silvio Fernández (disambiguation), multiple people
 Silvio Frondizi (1907–1974), Argentine lawyer
 Silvio Gai (1873–1967), Italian politician 
 Silvio Gava (1901–1999), Italian politician
 Silvio Gazzaniga (1921–2016), Italian sculptor
 Silvio Gesell (1862–1930), German economist
 Silvio Horta (1974–2020), American TV writer and producer
 Silvio Leonard (born 1955), Cuban sprinter
 Silvio Marzolini (1940–2020), Argentine footballer
 Silvio Micali (born 1954), Italian computer scientist
 Silvio Orlando (born 1957), Italian actor
 Silvio Rodríguez (born 1946), Cuban musician
 Silvio Passerini (1469–1529), Cardinal and Lord of Florence
 Silvio Piola (1913–1996), Italian footballer
 Silvio Savelli (died 1515), Italian condotierro
 Silvio Spaccesi (1926–2015), Italian actor and voice actor
 Silvio Smalun (born 1979), German figure skater
 Silvio Zaninelli (1913–1979), American football player

Sílvio
 Sílvio (footballer, born 1970), full name Sílvio César Ferreira da Costa, Brazilian football forward
 Sílvio (footballer, born 1985), full name Silvio Carlos de Oliveira, Brazilian football forward
 Sílvio (footballer, born 1987), full name Sílvio Manuel de Azevedo Ferreira Sá Pereira, Portuguese football full-back
 Silvio (footballer, born April 1988), full name Silvio Henderson Santos de Freitas, Brazilian football defender
 Sílvio (footballer, born October 1988), full name Sílvio Silas da Silva Walenga, Brazilian football goalkeeper
 Sílvio (footballer, born 1994), full name Sílvio Rodrigues Pereira Júnior, Brazilian football forward
 Sílvio Malvezi (born 1960), Brazilian Olympic basketball player
 Sílvio Santos (born 1930), Brazilian TV host

Fictional characters 
 Silvio Dante, from the TV series The Sopranos
 Silvio Caruso, from the game Hitman

Italian masculine given names